Mera Saathi ( My Companion) is a 1985  Hindi-language action-drama film, produced by K. Kesava Rao under the Sree Brahmarambika Films banner and directed by K. Raghavendra Rao. It stars Jeetendra, Jaya Prada, Rajiv Kapoor, Mandakini in the pivotal roles and music composed by Bappi Lahiri. The film is a remake of the Telugu movie Dharmaatmudu (1983).

Plot
Ranga (Jeetendra) a rowdy, lives alone, one day an unknown girl named Ragini (Jayaprada) enters into his house accidentally and changes his way of living. Ranga learns that she ran away from home to protect herself from Bansi Das (Shakti Kapoor) who wants to marry her for her property. Ranga protects her from him and marries her and lives a happy life. One day Ragini learns that he is in a line of crime: she asks him to change his lifestyle; Ranga changes his entire lifestyle and joins as a worker in a factory, he and Ragini lives very happily; they are blessed with a daughter. After some time, when the factory runs into heavy losses Ranga takes the same factory on  lease, develops it and becomes a millionaire. After a few years their daughter Shanthi (Mandakini) whom Ranga loves more than anyone else, loves a guy Shyam (Rajeev Kapoor) who is in the trap of Bansi Das. Ranga learns this and he doesn't agree with their marriage but, Shanthi marries Shyam without his permission, Shyam takes away the entire property of Ranga and sends him and Ragini away from their house, then Bansi Das cheats Shyam and keeps him in his custody, and as Ranga learns this, he protects Shyam from Bansi Das, Shyam also realizes his mistakes and then they all live happily.

Cast
 Jeetendra as Ranganath "Ranga"
 Jaya Prada as Ragini
 Rajiv Kapoor as Shyam
 Mandakini as Shanti
 Shakti Kapoor as Bansi Das
 Asrani as Ram Kumar
 Sharat Saxena as Sultan
 Aruna Irani as Ram Kumar's Adamant Play Character
 Amjad Khan as Ram Kumar's Adamant Play Character
 Sujit Kumar as Police Inspector
 Bharat Bhushan as Gopal
Manik Irani as Goon of Bansi das

Soundtrack
Lyrics: Indeevar

References

External links

1985 films
Films directed by K. Raghavendra Rao
Hindi remakes of Telugu films
Films scored by Bappi Lahiri
Indian action drama films
1980s Hindi-language films
1980s action drama films
1985 drama films